Wright's skink (Trachylepis wrightii), also known commonly as Wright's mabuya, is a species of lizard in the family Scincidae. The species is endemic to Seychelles. There are two recognized subspecies.

Etymology
The specific name, wrightii, is in honor of Irish naturalist Edward Perceval Wright.

Geographic range
T. wrightii is found only in Seychelles.

Habitat
The natural habitats of T. wrightii are subtropical or tropical dry forests and subtropical or tropical dry shrubland.

Description

Reproduction
The mode of reproduction of T. wrightii is unknown.

Subspecies
Two subspecies are recognized as being valid, including the nominotypical subspecies.
Trachylepis wrightii ilotensis 
Trachylepis wrightii wrightii

References

Further reading
Boulenger GA (1887). Catalogue of the Lizards in the British Museum (Natural History). Second Edition. Volume III ... Scincidae ... London: Trustees of the British Museum (Natural History). (Taylor and Francis, printers). xii + 575 pp. + Plates I-XL. ("Mabuia [sic] wrightii ", new species, p. 162 + Plate VIII).
Pawlowski S (2015). "Im Habitat des Wright Skinks Trachylepis wrightii (BOULENGER, 1887) auf Cousin ". Sauria 37 (1): 16–19. (in German).
Rendahl H (1939). "Zur Herpetologie der Seychellen. 1. Reptilien ". Zoologische Jahrbücher, Abteilung für Systematik, Geographie und Biologie der Tiere 72: 255–328. (Mabuya wrightii ilotensis, new subspecies, p. 294). (in German).

Trachylepis
Lizards of Africa
Endemic fauna of Seychelles
Reptiles described in 1887
Taxa named by George Albert Boulenger
Taxonomy articles created by Polbot